The 2020-21 Union Dutchmen ice hockey season would have been the 80th season of play for the program and the 30th season in the ECAC Hockey conference.

Season
As a result of the ongoing COVID-19 pandemic the entire college ice hockey season was delayed. Despite the issues, Union and most of ECAC Hockey was expecting to start playing some time in November. On October 16, Yale raised the campus alert status from green to yellow when the 18th member of the men's ice hockey team tested positive for coronavirus. Less than a month later, the Ivy League, the primary conference for 6 ECAC programs, announced that it was cancelling all winter sports for 2020–21. Additionally the schools would not be participating in any Spring sports until the end of February. While Union was not bound by the IVY League's ruling, the other capitol-district school Rensselaer cancelled its season on November 16 and Union followed suit the following day.

Because the NCAA had previously announced that all winter sports athletes would retain whatever eligibility they possessed through at least the following year, none of Union's players would lose a season of play. However, the NCAA also approved a change in its transfer regulations that would allow players to transfer and play immediately rather than having to sit out a season, as the rules previously required.

Departures

Recruiting

† played junior hockey or equivalent during 2020–21 season.

Roster
As of January 25, 2021.

|}

Standings

Schedule and Results
Season Cancelled

Awards and honors

References

Union Dutchmen ice hockey seasons
Union Dutchmen
Union Dutchmen
Union Dutchmen
2021 in sports in New York (state)
2020 in sports in New York (state)